The Battle of Black Jack took place on June 2, 1856, when antislavery forces, led by the noted abolitionist John Brown, attacked the encampment of Henry C. Pate near Baldwin City, Kansas. The battle is cited as one incident of "Bleeding Kansas" and a contributing factor leading up to the American Civil War of 1861 to 1865.

Background
In 1854, the U.S. Congress had passed the Kansas-Nebraska Act which stipulated that the residents of these territories would decide whether they wished to enter the Union as a slave or free state. This doctrine became known as popular sovereignty. Organized groups from the North sent thousands of abolitionist supporters to Kansas in an attempt to tip the balance in favor of free state advocates, to counter settlement from proslavery supporters from Missouri. As a result, pro- and antislavery groups had frequent clashes culminating in the Battle of Black Jack.

On May 21, 1856, Henry Clay Pate participated with a posse of 750 proslavery forces in the sacking of Lawrence, which destroyed the Free State Hotel, two abolitionist newspaper offices and their printing presses. They also looted throughout the village. The next day, Congressman Preston Brooks from South Carolina physically attacked Senator Charles Sumner of Massachusetts in the Senate chambers with a cane. He continued hitting after the senator was bleeding and unconscious. Three days later, a band of men, led by John Brown and comrade Captain Shore, executed five proslavery men with broadswords at Pottawatomie Creek. Brown's men let Jerome Glanville and James Harris return home to the cabin of Harris. This incident became known as the Pottawatomie massacre. Following the massacre, three antislavery men were taken prisoner, including two of John Brown's sons.

Battle
On June 2, 1856, Brown and 29 others met Henry Pate and fought the battle of Black Jack. This started after Brown's two sons were captured and held prisoner by Pate. The five-hour battle went in Brown's favor and Pate and 22 of his followers were captured and held for ransom. Brown agreed to release them as long as they released Brown's sons.

This "signal victory"..."so much encouraged the Free State men, and correspondingly depressed the Missouri invaders."

Pate's 1859 interview of Brown
During the month between John Brown's death sentence and his execution, Pate travelled to Charles Town from his home in Petersburg, Virginia to interview him, and prepare a joint statement, witnessed by jailor John Avis, that Pate had printed.

Town of Black Jack

The town of Black Jack was established in 1855 as a trail town on the Santa Fe Trail. The town became incorporated in 1857 and the threat of border warfare was still a problem in Black Jack. At its peak, Black Jack contained a tavern, post office, blacksmiths, a hotel, general store, doctor's office, schools and two churches but by the end of the Civil War, Santa Fe traffic began to dwindle and soon the town was abandoned.

Legacy
The site of the battle is located near U.S. Highway 56, about three miles (5 km) east of Baldwin City, and is partially within Robert Hall Pearson Memorial Park, designated by the state of Kansas in honor of one of Brown and Shore's fighters who gave a handwritten account of the battle. Signs placed throughout the battle site point out where the battle began and ended. Efforts are underway to preserve both the Pearson Memorial Park and the Ivan Boyd Prairie Preserve across the road.

In 1970, to commemorate the 100th anniversary of the founding of Baldwin City, Baker University professor and playwright Don Mueller (not to be confused with the baseball player of the same name) and Phyllis E. Braun, Business Manager, produced a musical play entitled The Ballad of Black Jack to tell the story of the events that led up to the battle. The Ballad of Black Jack played as part of the city's Maple Leaf Festival from 1970 to 1983 and again from 2001 to 2005. It also played in nearby Lawrence in 1986 and in 2006 and 2007 as a part of Lawrence's Civil War On The Western Frontier program. The play returned to Lawrence in 2021 after a 14-year hiatus.

In 2012 the National Park Service designated the battlefield a National Historic Landmark.

See also
 List of battles fought in Kansas
 List of National Historic Landmarks in Kansas
 National Register of Historic Places listings in Douglas County, Kansas
 Pate's visit to Brown in the Charles Town jail

References

External links

 The Black Jack Battlefield and Nature Trust
 "Santa Fe Trail Site" View From USGS Aerial Photographs.

1856 riots
1856 in Kansas Territory
Bleeding Kansas
Douglas County, Kansas
National Historic Landmarks in Kansas
Black Jack
National Register of Historic Places in Douglas County, Kansas
June 1856 events
John Brown and family in Kansas